Maxyutovo (Mäqsüt) is a rural locality (a selo) and the administrative centre of Maxyutovsky Selsoviet, Kugarchinsky District, Bashkortostan, Russia. The population was 1,003 as of 2010. There are 14 streets.

Geography 
Maxyutovo is located 57 km south of Mrakovo (the district's administrative centre) by road. Nazarkino is the nearest rural locality.

See also
 Bandabika and Yaransa

References 

Rural localities in Kugarchinsky District